Africa: Rivista trimestrale di studi e documentazione was a quarterly Italian academic journal devoted to African studies published by the Italian Institute for Africa and the Orient (Istituto Italiano per l'Africa e l'Oriente (IsIAO)).
The journal had forerunners like Africa. Notiziario dell'Associazione fra le imprese italiane for Italian companies since 1946. The title Africa: Rivista bimestrale di studi e documentazione appeared for the first time in 1957. Chief editors included the Africanist Teobaldo Filesi (1912-2002) who in 1965 chose a Humanities  approach, and the historian Gianluigi Rossi (1941) who maintained this orientation since 1994. 

After an interlude from 2011 up to 2018, the journal was relaunched in 2019 as Africa: Rivista semestrale di studi e ricerche, published biannually by the institute Centro Studi per i Popoli Extraeuropei “Cesare Bonacossa” of the University of Pavia with publishing house Viella Libreria Editrice. It is also supported by ISMEO (Associazione Internazionale di Studi sul Mediterraneo e l’Oriente).

The journal features the sections Articoli (Articles), Note e testimonianze (Notes and reports) and Recensioni (Book reviews) and aims to present original research and documentation of African studies to promote the collaboration between Italian and African scholars.

Issues from the years 1950-2009 and 2019-2020 can be read at JSTOR.

References

Academic journals of Italy
African studies journals
Publications established in 1946